Cattolica Calcio S.M. is an Italian association football club located in Cattolica, Emilia-Romagna. It currently plays in the Serie D. Its colors are red and yellow. 

In July 2019, A.C. Cattolica Calcio merged with the previous owners of San Marino Calcio and were renamed as Cattolica Calcio S.M. Despite playing in Cattolica, the club retains their headquarters in San Marino.

External links
Official homepage

Football clubs in Italy
Football clubs in Emilia-Romagna
Association football clubs established in 1923
Serie C clubs
1923 establishments in Italy